Rare Birds is a 2001 Canadian comedy/drama film. It was directed by Sturla Gunnarsson and written by Edward Riche based on his novel. The film features spectacular scenery from Cape Spear, Newfoundland, Canada. It also features music by The Pogues and characteristic Canadian Maritime musicians such as Ashley MacIsaac.

Plot 
Dave (Hurt) has had some bad luck recently. His wife (McCarthy) lives in Washington, DC, his restaurant, the Auk is not doing good business. Phonse (Jones) helps Dave by making up a story about a rare bird (Tasker's Sulphureous) sighting which begins to help Dave's business. Phonse has been working on a prototype Recreational Submarine Vehicle (RSV) and is concerned that the Winnebago company is conducting industrial espionage and trying to steal his plans. Phonse also finds ten kilos of cocaine and tries to get rid of it with the help of Dave. Dave falls in love with Alice (Parker), Phonse's sister-in-law, a girl from Gull Tickle. Phonse blows up his RSV. Claire asks Dave for a divorce.  Alice goes off to college.  Dave finds someone to manage the restaurant and he is seen chasing Alice's taxi.

Cast 
 William Hurt ... as Dave
 Andy Jones ... as Phonse
 Molly Parker ... as Alice (a girl from Gull Tickle)
 Vicky Hynes ... as Deb (another girl from Gull Tickle)
 Sheila McCarthy... as Claire

External links

Edward Riche

2001 films
English-language Canadian films
Canadian comedy-drama films
2001 comedy-drama films
Films based on Canadian novels
Films directed by Sturla Gunnarsson
Films set in Newfoundland and Labrador
2001 comedy films
2001 drama films
2000s English-language films
2000s Canadian films